A marketing board is an organization created by many producers to try to market their product and increase consumption and thus prices. It can also be defined as an organization set up by a government to regulate the buying and selling of a certain commodity within a specified area. They most commonly exist to help sell farm products such as milk, eggs, beef or tripe and are funded by the farmers or processors of those crops or products.  Marketing boards often also receive funding from governments as an agricultural subsidy.  The leadership and strategies of the marketing boards are set through votes by the farmers who are members of the board.

Marketing boards also sometimes act as a pool, controlling the price of farm products by forming a legal cartel. They also fund other ventures beneficial to their members such as research.

Marketing boards differ from industry trade groups in that their primary goal is marketing towards consumers, not governments, but they may also lobby on behalf of their supporters.  Industry trade groups might also advertise directly to consumers.

List of marketing boards

Botswana
Botswana Meat Commission
Botswana Agricultural Marketing Board

Canada
Canadian Wheat Board
Dairy Farmers of Ontario
Ontario Pork Producers' Marketing Board

Colombia
National Federation of Coffee Growers of Colombia

Ghana
Ghana Cocoa Board

India
Agricultural produce market committee
Kerala Co-operative Milk Marketing Federation
Tamil Nadu State Agricultural Marketing Board (TNSAMB)

Ireland
Irish Dairy Board

United Kingdom
British Wool Marketing Board
British Egg Industry Council
Egg Marketing Board
Milk Marketing Board
Potato Council
Tripe Marketing Board, an internet parody

United States
American Egg Board
National Pork Board
Walnut Marketing Board

California
Blue Diamond Growers
California Avocado Commission
California Milk Processor Board
California Raisin Marketing Board

See also
Agricultural marketing
State trading enterprises